Elections to Rochdale Council in Greater Manchester, England were held on 5 May 2011, the same day as other Local Elections across England. One third of the council was up for election.

After the election, the composition of the council was:
Labour 29
Conservative 14
Liberal Democrat 13
Others 4

Election result

Ward Results

Balderstone and Kirkholt ward

Bamford ward

Castleton ward

Central Rochdale ward

East Middleton ward

Healey ward

Hopwood Hall ward

Kingsway ward

Littleborough Lakeside ward

Milkstone and Deeplish ward

Milnrow and Newhey ward

Norden ward

North Heywood ward

North Middleton ward

Smallbridge and Firgrove ward

South Middleton ward

Spotland and Falinge ward

Wardle and West Littleborough ward

West Heywood ward

West Middleton ward

References

2011
2011 English local elections
2010s in Greater Manchester